Vinné is a village and municipality in Michalovce District in the Kosice Region of eastern Slovakia.

History
In historical records the village was first mentioned in 1249.

Geography
The village lies at an altitude of 108 metres and covers an area of 29.784 km². The municipality has a population of 1638 people.

Ethnicity
The village is 99% Slovak.

Facilities
The village has a public library, a swimming pool, gymnasium and a football pitch. The village has a hotel, guesthouse and a commercial bank.

Gallery

References

External links

http://www.statistics.sk/mosmis/eng/run.html

Villages and municipalities in Michalovce District